Westmore may refer to:

People
 McKenzie Westmore (born 1977), American actress who plays the role of Sheridan Crane on the television soap opera Passions
 Michael Westmore (born 1938), American makeup artist
 Wally Westmore (1906–1973), make-up artist for Hollywood films

Other uses
 Westmore, Vermont, town in Orleans County, Vermont, United States
 Westmore family, prominent family in Hollywood make-up